HMS Hussar was a Royal Navy Halcyon-class minesweeper of World War II.

The headquarters officer assigning the minesweeping project to 1MF neglected to inform the Flag Officer British Assault Area (Rear‑Admiral Rivett‑Carnac), who was responsible for defending the invasion beaches from E-boats operating out of Le Havre. 1MF was observed on a southwesterly leg of the minesweeping operation and assumed to be German ships proceeding to attack Allied shipping off the invasion beaches. The Admiral's staff requested No. 263 Squadron RAF and No. 266 Squadron RAF to attack the presumed enemy ships. The squadrons responded with 16 Typhoons armed with 20 mm cannon and High Explosive "60 lb" RP-3 unguided rockets. RAF pilots identified 1MF as apparently friendly shipping, but upon questioning their orders were told the Royal Navy had no ships in the area.

In a well-executed attack out of the sun at 13:30, the Typhoons sank Hussar and Britomart; and Salamander was damaged far beyond economical repair and written off as a constructive total loss. Eighty-six British sailors were killed and 124 more were injured. 1MF identified the Typhoons as friendly, and poor visibility into the sun prevented early recognition of the impending "friendly fire". Jason established radio contact to terminate the attack.

References

 

Halcyon-class minesweepers
Ships sunk by British aircraft
Friendly fire incidents of World War II
1934 ships
Ships built in Southampton
Maritime incidents in August 1944
World War II shipwrecks in the English Channel
Ships built by John I. Thornycroft & Company
Minesweepers sunk by aircraft